Alexander Sibiryakov (Russian Александр Сибиряков) was a steamship that was built in Scotland in 1909 as Bellaventure, and was originally a seal hunting ship in Newfoundland. In 1917 the Russian government bought her to be an icebreaker. She served the RSFSR and Soviet Union until 1942, when she was sunk by enemy action. The ship gave notable service in the Russian Arctic during the 1930s.

The ship was recorded as Bellaventure until at least 1920. By 1927 she had been renamed Александр Сибиряков. In the Latin alphabet her name was rendered Alexander Sibiriakov until at least 1935. This had been changed to Alexander Sibiryakov by 1939.

Building
In 1908 A Harvey & Co of St John's, Newfoundland ordered a pair of ships from shipbuilders in Glasgow, Scotland. D&W Henderson Ltd built Bellaventure, launching her on 23 November 1908. Napier and Miller built her sister ship Bonaventure, launching her on 5 December 1908. Both ships were completed in January 1909.

She had a single screw, driven by a three-cylinder triple expansion engine that was rated at 347 NHP.

Bellaventures United Kingdom official number was 127684 and her code letters were TQNL. By 1914 she was equipped for wireless telegraphy. Her call sign was VOM.

1914 Newfoundland Sealing Disaster

On 2 April 1914 Bellaventure, commanded by Captain Isaac Randell, was off the northern coast of Newfoundland taking part in a seal hunt. 132 hunters from another steamship, had become lost in a storm on an ice floe. After 54 hours Bellaventure rescued the survivors and recovered 77 dead bodies. She sailed through the Narrows of St. John's, Newfoundland, with her flags at half mast.

Bought by Russia
In 1917 the Russian government bought both Bellaventure and Bonaventure. In 1919, in the North Russia intervention in the Russian Civil War, United Kingdom forces in Arkhangelsk took control of both ships, and Ellerman's Wilson Line was appointed to manage Bellaventure.

Eventually the two ships were renamed Alexander Sibiryakov and Vladimir Rusanov, after two Russian arctic explorers.

Between the wars
Alexander Sibiryakov made the first successful crossing of the Northern Sea Route in a single navigation without wintering. This historic voyage, which had been Mikhail Lomonosov's dream, was organized by the All-Union Arctic Institute (now called the Arctic and Antarctic Research Institute).

Alexander Sibiryakov sailed on 28 June 1932 from the Krasny (previously Sobornoy) docks in Arkhangelsk, crossed the Kara Sea and chose a northern, unexplored way around Severnaya Zemlya to the Laptev Sea. In September, after calling at Tiksi and the mouth of the Kolyma, the propeller shaft broke and the icebreaker drifted for 11 days. However, Alexander Sibiryakov crossed the Chukchi Sea using improvised sails and arrived in the Bering Strait in October. This was regarded as a heroic feat of Soviet polar seamen and Chief of Expedition Otto Schmidt and Captain Vladimir Voronin were received with many honors at their return to Russia.

On 24 November 1936 Alexander Sibiryakov was stranded near Cape Menshikov in the Kara Sea. She was refloated on 25 December 1936 and returned to service in June 1938.

Wartime service and sinking
In September 1941 the Soviet Navy requisitioned Alexander Sibiryakov. She was given the pennant number LD-6. She continued in service, commanded by Captain Anatoli Kacharava. She was defensively armed, at first with several  and  guns. By 1942 one  gun had been added.

On 25 August 1942 during Operation Wunderland the Kriegsmarine heavy cruiser  attacked her off the northwest shore of Russky Island in the Nordenskiöld Archipelago. Despite being heavily outgunned, Alexander Sibiryakov defended herself for an hour before Admiral Scheer sank her. Alexander Sibiryakov also sent a wireless telegraph signal that warned east and west bound Allied convoys of the attacks, enabling them to avoid the area.

Most members of Alexander Sibiryakovs crew were killed either in battle or when she sank. Admiral Scheer captured 22, including severely wounded Captain Kacharava. One crewman, stoker Pavel Vavilov, managed to reach Beluha Island and was rescued by a Soviet ship 34 or 35 days later. In total only 15 crew members survived the war. Soviet sources say 79 killed, 19 taken as prisoners of war, and only 13 of them survived captivity.

When the Finnish icebreaker  was handed over to the Soviet Union, she was renamed Sibiryakov.

References

Bibliography

External links

1909 ships
Arctic exploration vessels
Chukchi Sea
Icebreakers of the Soviet Union
Kara Sea
Maritime incidents in August 1942
Polar exploration by Russia and the Soviet Union
Ships built on the River Clyde
Shipwrecks in the Kara Sea
Steamships of Canada
Steamships of the Soviet Union
World War II shipwrecks in the Arctic Ocean